Estarj, also known as Estāj, is a village in Nasrabad Rural District, in the Central District of Taft County, Yazd Province, Iran. At the 2006 census, its population was 13, in 5 families.

References 

Populated places in Taft County